The 1986 Hardy Cup was the 1986 edition of the Canadian intermediate, senior ice hockey championship.

Final
Best of 7
Dundas 7 Lloydminster 3
Dundas 3 Lloydminster 1
Dundas 7 Lloydminster 1
Dundas 7 Lloydminster 3
Dundas Real McCoys beat Lloydminster Border Kings 4–0 on series.

External links
Hockey Canada

Hardy Cup
Hardy